Marxist–Leninist Front of the Peoples of Spain (in Spanish: Frente Marxista-Leninista de los Pueblos de España, abbreviated F(M-L)PE) is a communist party in Spain. The group emerged in 1987, as a split from the Communist Party of the Peoples of Spain. The group was initially known as the Leninist Front of the Communist Party of the Peoples of Spain. The founding president of the group was Francisco Expósito Prieto. It took the name F(M-L)PE in 1992. In April 1993 the Leninist Organization, a group based in Llobregat, merged into F(M-L)PE. In 1995 it was registered with the Spanish Ministry of Interior, with an office in La Roca del Vallès (Barcelona Province). The group published Nuestra Lucha ('Our Struggle'). Leaders of the group have included Lorenzo Ruiz, Gregorio Fernández, Jesús Prades, Antonio de Miguel Quiles and Evangelino Fernández.

References

1984 establishments in Spain
Communist parties in Spain
Far-left politics in Spain
Political parties established in 1984